{{safesubst:#invoke:RfD|||month = March
|day = 17
|year = 2023
|time = 07:55
|timestamp = 20230317075502

|content=
REDIRECT Grading in education 

}}